For articles on Irish television in the 1990s please see:
1990 in Irish television
1991 in Irish television
1992 in Irish television
1993 in Irish television
1994 in Irish television
1995 in Irish television
1996 in Irish television
1997 in Irish television
1998 in Irish television
1999 in Irish television

 
Television in Ireland